Lviv Airlines was an airline headquartered on the grounds of Lviv International Airport in Lviv, Ukraine. It operates chartered passenger and cargo services out of Lviv International Airport.

History 

The airline was established by Air Ukraine in 1992 from the Lviv Division of the Aeroflot Ukraine Directorate. As of March 2007, it had 446 employees. Since 2009, there are no scheduled services. Its only remaining aircraft is used for charter flights, mostly on behalf of Aerosvit Airlines and Donbassaero.

Fleet
The Lviv Airlines fleet included the following aircraft (at September 2009):

3 Yakovlev Yak-42s

References

External links

Defunct airlines of Ukraine
Airlines established in 1992